Combined steam and gas (COSAG) is a propulsion system for ships using a combination of steam turbines and gas turbines to power the shafts. A gearbox and clutches enable either of the engines or both of them together to drive the shaft. It has the advantage of the cruising efficiency and reliability of steam and the rapid acceleration and start-up time of gas.

The  also used it.

Marine propulsion
Steam power